The Gangwon dialect is spoken in South Korea's Gangwon Province and in North Korea's Kangwŏn Province. Although they are large provinces by area, relatively few people lived in the Gangwon Province. As a result, people living in the western side of Gangwon (Yeongseo) did not develop a highly distinctive dialect. However, the part of Gangwon that stretches on the eastern coast of Korea's Yeongdong region did develop a distinctive dialect. This is because the Taebaek Mountains bisect the Gangwon Province, and the people on eastern Gangwon are isolated from the high mountains.

Distinguishing Features of the Gangwon Dialect:

1. ㅆ (ss) is pronounced as ㅅ (s).

2. The standard 아 (ah) sound is changed to 어 (eo) at the end of sentences. 

3. Questions may end in 나 (na), -노 (no), -고 (go), -가 (ga).

References

Korean dialects
Korean language in South Korea
Gangwon Province, South Korea
Kangwon Province (North Korea)